The 2001 Team Ice Racing World Championship was the 23rd edition of the Team World Championship. The final was held on ?, 2001, in Berlin, in Germany. Russia won the title.

Final classification

See also 
 2001 Individual Ice Speedway World Championship
 2001 Speedway World Cup in classic speedway
 2001 Speedway Grand Prix in classic speedway

References 

Ice speedway competitions
World